Kogu may refer to:

Places
 Kogu, a community in Ngamiland East, Maun Region, Botswana
 Koğu, a variant name for Koğuk, a community in Diyarbakır, Turkey
Kogu, a variant name for Koğu Dere, an arroyo (wadi) and intermittent stream in Diyarbakır, Turkey

Nigeria
 Kogu, a community in Biu LGA, Borno State, Nigeria, former capital of Biu Kingdom (now Biu Emirate)
 Kogu, a community in Shani LGA, Borno State, Nigeria
 Kogu, a community in East-Central State, Nigeria

Fictional characters
 Kogu, a character in Dragon Ball Z: Bojack Unbound